The All-Japan Women's Ice Hockey Championship is an annual ice hockey club tournament in Japan. First contested in 1978 and officially sanctioned by the Japan Ice Hockey Federation in 1982, the championship is one of the oldest continuously held women's ice hockey tournaments in the world. It can be interpreted as the women's counterpart to the men's All Japan Ice Hockey Championship.

Champions

References

External links
Official website of the Japan Ice Hockey Federation 

Women's ice hockey in Japan
Women
Japan